Castel Focognano is   comune in the province of Arezzo, Tuscany, central Italy. 
 
The comune lies in the Casentino valley on the left bank of the River Arno.  Although it is named after a village on the slopes of the Alpe di Catenaia, the municipal seat is in the industrial town of Rassina.

History
During World War II Rassina was home for many American soldiers who were hiding or preparing the offensive on the German army.

Many people were killed while fighting with Fascist soldiers.

In 1992 Rassina was completely flooded by the Arno river.

Economy

Today Rassina is expanding and is becoming one of Casentino's leading industrial centres. It is home to one of Europe's largest cement works.

Sister cities

 Champcevinel, France, since 1992

References

Cities and towns in Tuscany